Mowry Landing (formerly, Mawry Landing and Mowry's Landing) is a former settlement in Alameda County, California. It lies at an elevation of 10 feet (3 m).

Mowry Landing is near the western ends of Stevenson Blvd and Mowry Ave, within the current borders of Newark. It was named after Origin Mowry, a Mormon settler who moved there in 1846. It became a shipping port for produce and grain in the mid 19th century.

External links
 Map

References

Unincorporated communities in California
Unincorporated communities in Alameda County, California